Zoran Mihailović (born 2 June 1996) is a Serbian football forward who plays for Zemun.

References

External links
 
 Zoran Mihailović stats at utakmica.rs 
 

1996 births
Living people
Sportspeople from Šabac
Association football forwards
Serbian footballers
FK Jagodina players
FK Sloga Petrovac na Mlavi players
FK Kolubara players
FK Proleter Novi Sad players
FK Sloboda Užice players
OFK Žarkovo players
FK Zemun players
Serbian SuperLiga players
Serbian First League players